This is a list of German military units during World War II which contains all military units that served with the German Armed Forces (Wehrmacht).

Major units above corps level are listed here. For smaller units, see list of German corps in World War II and list of German divisions in World War II.

Army commands (Oberbefehlshaber)
OB stands for Oberbefehlshaber or Supreme Command
OB Niederlande – Netherlands – (7 April 1945 – 6 May 1945)
OB Nord – North Reich – (2 May – 8 May 1945)
OB Nordwest – Northwest Reich – (11 November 1944 – 4 May 1945)
OB Ost (Oberost) – East – (3 October 1939 – 21 July 1940)
OB Oberrhein – Upper Rhine – (26 November 1944 – 25 January 1945)
OB Süd – Mediterranean and North African theatre – (2 December 1941 – 16 November 1943)
OB Südost – Balkans and Greece – (1 January 1943 – 8 May 1945)
OB Südwest – Italy – (21 November 1943 – 2 May 1945)
OB West – France, Low countries, Western Germany – (10 October 1940 – 22 April 1945)

Army groups

Heeresgruppen 
 Army Group A
 Army Group B
 Army Group C
 Army Group D
 Army Group E (Heeresgruppe Löhr)
 Army Group F
 Army Group G
 Army Group H
 Army Group Africa (Heeresgruppe Afrika)
 Army Group Don
 Army Group Courland  (Heeresgruppe Kurland))
 Army Group Liguria (Heeresgruppen Ligurien)
 Army Group Centre (Heeresgruppe Mitte)
 Army Group North (Heeresgruppe Nord)
 Army Group North Ukraine (Heeresgruppe Nordukraine)
 Army Group Upper Rhine (Heeresgruppe Oberrhein)  
 Army Group South (Heeresgruppe Süd)
 Army Group South Ukraine (Heeresgruppe Südukraine)
 Army Group Tunisia (Heeresgruppe Tunis)
 Army Group Vistula (Heeresgruppe Weichsel)
 Army Group West – See OB West

Armeegruppen 
These were temporary groupings of armies below the formal army group level.

 Panzer Group Guderian
 Panzer Group Kleist
 Army Group Weichs
 Army Group Ruoff
 Army Group Hoth
 Army Group Raus/Henrici
 Army Group Wöhler
 Army Group Fretter-Pico/Balck
 Army Group Student
 Army Group Antonescu
 Army Group Dumitrescu
 Army Group Ligurien
 Army Group Felber
 Army Group Frießner
 Army Group Blumentritt
 Army Group Steiner

Armies (Armeeoberkommando) 
 1st Panzer Army
 2nd Panzer Army
 3rd Panzer Army
 4th Panzer Army
 5th Panzer Army
 6th Panzer Army
 1st Parachute Army
 1st Army
 2nd Army (as Armeeoberkommando Ostpreussen in 1945)
 3rd Army
 4th Army
 5th Army
 6th Army
 7th Army
 8th Army
 9th Army
 10th Army
 11th Army
 12th Army
 14th Army
 15th Army
 16th Army
 17th Army
 18th Army
 19th Army
 20th Mountain Army
 21st Army
 24th Army
 25th Army
 Panzer Army Africa (also known as the Deutsch-Italienische Panzer-Armee during 1942-43)
 Army East Prussia
 Lappland Army (redesignated as the 20th Mountain Army)
 Armeeoberkommando Norwegen

Armored groups (Panzergruppe) 
 1st Panzer Group
 2nd Panzer Group
 3rd Panzer Group
 4th Panzer Group
 Panzer Group Africa
 Panzer Group Guderian (see 2nd Panzer Group/2nd Panzer Army)
 Panzer Group Hoth (1940)
 Panzer Group Kleist (see 1st Panzer Group/1st Panzer Army)
 Panzer Group West (see 5th Panzer Army)

Corps

Divisions

Brigades

See also 
 List of Waffen SS units
 List of German army groups in World War II
Heer
World War II
Germany
Military units